Arizona's 4th Legislative District is one of 30 in the state, covering parts of Pima, Maricopa, Pinal, and Yuma counties. As of 2021, there are 59 precincts in the district – 23 in Yuma, 18 in Maricopa, 17 in Pima, and 1 in Pinal – with a total registered voter population of 111,437. The district has an overall population of 216,706.

Political representation
The district is represented for the 2021–2022 Legislative Session in the State Senate by Lisa Otondo (D, Yuma) and in the House of Representatives by Charlene Fernandez (D, Yuma) and Joel John (R, Goodyear).

See also
 List of Arizona Legislative Districts
 Arizona State Legislature

References

Arizona legislative districts
Maricopa County, Arizona
Yuma County, Arizona
Pima County, Arizona
Pinal County, Arizona